The 2019 T20 Kwacha Cup was a Twenty20 International/Women's Twenty20 International (T20I/WT20I) cricket event between the men's and women's national cricket teams of Malawi and Mozambique. Both the men's and women's series consisted of seven T20I/WT20I matches played between 6 and 10 November 2019 in Blantyre and Lilongwe, Malawi. The venue for the first four men's T20I matches was the Lilongwe Golf Club in Lilongwe, and these were followed by two matches at Indian Sports Club and one match at Saint Andrews International High School in Blantyre. All of the WT20I matches were played at Saint Andrews International High School. Malawi won the men's series 5–1, and the women's series 4–3.

Men's series

Both Malawi and Mozambique played their first matches with official T20I status, since the International Cricket Council's decision to grant T20I status to all matches played between Associate Members after 1 January 2019. These were the first T20I matches to be played in Malawi. Four matches were played at Lilongwe Golf Club in Lilongwe, two at Indian Sports Club in Blantyre and one at Saint Andrews International High School in Blantyre.

Squads

T20I series

1st T20I

2nd T20I

3rd T20I

4th T20I

5th T20I

6th T20I

7th T20I

Women's series

The women's series was played at Saint Andrews International High School in Blantyre. Malawi played their first WT20I matches since August 2018, and Mozambique last played in the 2019 ICC Women's Qualifier Africa in May 2019. These were the first WT20I matches to be played in Malawi.

Squads

WT20I series

1st WT20I

2nd WT20I

3rd WT20I

4th WT20I

5th WT20I

6th WT20I

7th WT20I

Notes

References

External links
 Series home at ESPNCricinfo (men's)
 Series home at ESPNCricinfo (women's)

Associate international cricket competitions in 2019–20